Cavanilla is a name that has been used four times, applied to four different groups of plants. None of the names is in common use today. Names are 

 Cavanilla J.F.Gmel. 1792 (Dombeya or Pentapetes or Pterospermum or Trochetia in Malvaceae; impossible to equate with a modern genus because no type was ever designated)
 Cavanilla Thunb. 1792 (Pyrenacantha in Icacinaceae)
 Cavanilla  Salisb. 1792 (Stewartia in Theaceae)
 Cavanilla Vell. 1829 (Caperonia in Euphorbiaceae) 

Species assigned to these various generic names with their closest modern equivalents
 Cavanilla acerifolia (L.) J.F.Gmel. -  Pterospermum acerifolium (L.) Willd.
 Cavanilla acutangula J.F.Gmel. - Dombeya acutangula Cav.
 Cavanilla angulata J.F.Gmel. - Dombeya acutangula Cav.
 Cavanilla decanthera J.F.Gmel. - Trochetia decanthera Benth.
 Cavanilla ferruginea J.F.Gmel. - Dombeya ferruginea Cav.
 Cavanilla florida Salisb. - Stewartia ovata (Cav.) Weath.
 Cavanilla grandiflora Kuntze - Pyrenacantha grandiflora Baill.
 Cavanilla kamassana Kuntze - unknown
 Cavanilla kirkii Kuntze - Pyrenacantha kirkii Baill.
 Cavanilla ovata J.F.Gmel. -  Dombeya ferruginea Cav.
 Cavanilla palmata J.F.Gmel. - Dombeya acutangula Cav.
 Cavanilla phoenicea J.F.Gmel. - Pentapetes phoenicea L.
 Cavanilla punctata J.F.Gmel. - Dombeya punctata Cav.
 Cavanilla scandens Thunb. - Pyrenacantha scandens  (Thunb.) Endl. ex Baill.
 Cavanilla tiliifolia J.F.Gmel. -  Dombeya acutangula Cav.
 Cavanilla tomentosa J.F.Gmel. - Dombeya tomentosa Cav.
 Cavanilla umbellata J.F.Gmel. -  Dombeya umbellata Cav.
 Cavanilla vogeliana (Baill.) Kuntze -  Pyrenacantha vogeliana Baill.
 Cavanilla volubilis Kuntze - unknown

References